Timothy Walker is a British film and television actor.

His most notable role was as Angus, the groom at the first wedding, in the 1994 film Four Weddings and a Funeral. He has also appeared in Nuremberg: Nazis on Trial, Looking for Victoria, Peak Practice, Monsignor Renard, Pie in the Sky and Doctor Who.

Filmography

External links
 
 Timothy Walker at Theatricalia

Living people
English male television actors
English male film actors
Year of birth missing (living people)